Malem is a garden-city neighbourhood in the city of Ghent, Belgium. The neighbourhood was built between 1948 and 1953 in a very homogeneous garden-city idea, with uniform white houses, that were designed to house victims of World War II. The neighbourhood has kept its original character. The area is located on the west side of the Ghent agglomeration.

External links

Geography of Ghent
Neighbourhoods in Belgium